Brigadier John Herbert Hardy CBE, MC (18 September 1893 – 3 August 1969) was a British Army officer who served as colonel of the King's Own Royal Regiment (Lancaster).

Military career
Hardy was commissioned as a lieutenant in the 3rd Battalion of the King's Own Royal Regiment (Lancaster) on 28 November 1913. He served in the First World War and was seconded to the Egyptian Army in 1917. He served in the Second World War as commanding officer of the 2nd Battalion of the King's Own Royal Regiment (Lancaster) from August 1939, where he took over from Neil Ritchie. His adjutant was Richard Anderson, later a lieutenant general. He was later second in Command of the Island of Cyprus from April 1941 and as commander of the Libyan Arab Force from July 1941. He went on to be commander of the Nile Valley Area in August 1942, commander of the Iraqi Levies in ‘Paiforce’ in October 1942 and commander of the Mersey Defences and Mersey Sub-District in February 1944. He also served as colonel of the King's Own Royal Regiment (Lancaster) (1947–57).

He was appointed a Commander of the Order of the British Empire in the 1946 New Year Honours.

References

External links
Generals of World War II

1893 births
1969 deaths
British Army personnel of World War I
British Army brigadiers of World War II
Commanders of the Order of the British Empire
King's Own Royal Regiment officers
Recipients of the Military Cross